Charlie Phillips (born July 2, 1937) is an American country music singer and songwriter. Phillips began singing for producer Norman Petty as a teenager, and had musical backing from Buddy Holly on some of his first recordings. Coral records released "One Faded Rose" and "Be My Bride". The B-side to "One Faded Rose" was "Sugartime", later a hit for the McGuire Sisters. Phillips later signed with Columbia Records. His first Columbia single, "I Guess I'll Never Learn", made number 9 on the Hot Country Songs charts. Phillips later left Columbia over dissatisfaction with his content, and recorded a demonstration recording for "Welcome to My World", later a hit for Jim Reeves. He also cut "The Big Ball Is in Cowtown" for Longhorn Records, and then "Souvenirs of Sorrow" for Reprise Records, but the latter was withdrawn when Reprise exited the country music market. Phillips then worked as a radio DJ and tried to record another album with Petty, but this album was cancelled due to Petty's death. He then toured in Texas with a Western swing band.

Discography

References

1937 births
American country singer-songwriters
American male singers
People from Clovis, New Mexico
Living people
Country musicians from New Mexico